Conasprella stenostoma is a species of sea snail, a marine gastropod mollusk in the family Conidae, the cone snails, cone shells or cones.

It is only known as a fossil.

Description

Distribution
This fossil species is known from the Neogene of the Dominican Republic.

References

 Hendricks J.R. (2015). Glowing seashells: diversity of fossilized coloration patterns on coral reef-associated cone snail (Gastropoda: Conidae) shells from the Neogene of the Dominican Republic

External links

stenostoma